Blaine Island is an island on the Kanawha River in the city of South Charleston, West Virginia. Blaine Island serves as the South Charleston Manufacturing Site for the Union Carbide Corporation, a subsidiary of the Dow Chemical Company. Union Carbide purchased Blaine Island in 1927 in order to expand their petrochemical manufacturing operations in South Charleston. The company previously had petrochemical plants in South Charleston in 1925 and Clendenin in 1920, which holds the distinction as the world's first petrochemical plant.

For this reason, locals occasionally refer to the island as "Carbide Island".

Blaine Island is named for a man of the surname of Blaine who erected a mill there before 1823. Blaine's mill was of log construction and its dam extended from the south side of the Kanawha River to the island. Fleming Cobb, an early settler, planted two pear trees on Blaine Island that he had brought from Tidewater Virginia in the 1780s, some of the first fruit trees known to be transplanted west of the Allegheny Mountains.

Today, Blaine Island is a multi-company site. Bayer Corporation owns and operates the Polyols Production Unit, formerly owned by Union Carbide. Today, Union Carbide provides staffing, services, and utilities to Bayer.

See also
List of islands of West Virginia

References

River islands of West Virginia
Islands of Kanawha County, West Virginia
Kanawha River